John H. Corscot (September 12, 1839 – May 13, 1926) was the Mayor of Madison, Wisconsin from 1893 to 1895.

Biography
Corscot was born on September 12, 1839 in the town of Winterswijk in The Netherlands. He was born as Jan Hendrik Kortschot, son of Gerrit Jan Kortschot and Berendina Freriks. He came to the United States in 1846, together with his parents and an elder brother. The family settled in Madison, Wisconsin.  He married Julia Francis Mayers. Corscot died on May 13, 1926.

References

Mayors of Madison, Wisconsin
1839 births
1926 deaths